Solonchak is a rural locality (a settlement) in "Posyolok Verkhny Baskunchak" of Akhtubinsky District, Astrakhan Oblast, Russia. The population was 7 as of 2010.

References 

Rural localities in Akhtubinsky District